The Chicago Academy for the Arts, founded in 1981, is an independent high school for the performing and visual arts located in the River West neighborhood of Chicago, Illinois. It was named a National School of Distinction by the John F. Kennedy Center for the Performing Arts. The Academy offers a co-curricular program: college-preparatory academic classes and professional-level arts training. The school day consists of six academic periods followed by a three-plus hour immersion in one of six arts disciplines: Dance, Media Arts (filmmaking, animation, creative writing), Music, Musical Theatre, Theatre, and Visual Arts. Students participate in more than 100 productions throughout the course of the school year, including concerts, plays, readings, screenings, recordings, and exhibitions.

Background
The Chicago Academy for the Arts high school was founded in 1981 by a group of artists, educators, and business professionals for the purpose of bringing a performing arts high school to Illinois. It is located in the historic school building constructed for St. John Cantius Parish.

The Academy students audition and submit portfolios during the admissions process. whereby only prospective students demonstrating an aptitude, potential, and dedication to their art are admitted.

In 2012, The Academy celebrated its 30th anniversary with a series of events, culminating in a gala event at the Harris Theater for Music and Dance at the Millennium Park Terrace. During this year, the school revised its mission statement to more clearly reflect the further development of its educational philosophy which integrates academics, arts, and the environment to educate the intellectual artist. The new mission statement reads:

The Chicago Academy for the Arts transforms emerging artists through a curriculum and culture which connect intellectual curiosity, critical thinking, and creativity to impart skills to lead and collaborate across diverse communities.

The atmosphere at the school has been described as encouraging and nurturing. It was once one of the few high schools to feature a course on existentialism and have workshops taught by guest tutors like Roger Ebert. A majority of graduates continue to higher education and/or professional arts careers.

Arts aspect of school 
Throughout the school year, students participate in more than 100 productions, including concerts and recitals, musicals, plays, readings, screenings, exhibitions, outreach opportunities, and benefits. Arts departments conclude each semester with a one-on-one student assessment and review process that includes self-reflections and goal-setting, juries, portfolio reviews, and interviews with faculty.

Each year, The Academy presents their All-School Showcase, highlighting the year's top work from each arts department.

Admissions 
The Academy students audition and submit portfolios during the admissions process. whereby only prospective students demonstrating an aptitude, potential, and dedication to their art are admitted. Admissions is a multi-step process, beginning with the audition in a chosen department. Once applicants successfully advance through the audition, their academic record is reviewed. Students must also take the Independent School Entrance Exam prior to enrollment. The Academy offers four opportunities to take the exam at the school. The admissions process concludes with a parent interview.

Notable alumni
 Lara Flynn Boyle, actress
 Ali Cobrin, actress
 Tom Gold, dancer
 Craig Hall, dancer, New York City Ballet
 Lalah Hathaway, Grammy Award-winning musician
 Pete Kovachevich guitarist
 Jack Peterson, filmmaker
 Adam Rifkin, producer
 Cecily Strong, actress, Saturday Night Live
 Justin Tranter songwriter and musician (Semi Precious Weapons)
 Robin Tunney, actress
 Nan Woods, actress
 Alex Wurman, composer
 Jeremiah Jae, Producer and Multimedia Artist
 Kimberly Jones, Author

References

External links 
Chicago Academy for the Arts website

Private high schools in Chicago
Educational institutions established in 1981
Schools of the performing arts in the United States
1981 establishments in Illinois